Paul Anthony Birch (born 3 December 1968) is an English retired professional footballer who played in the Football League for Brentford as a forward. He quit League football in October 1988 to become an estate agent.

Career statistics

References

1968 births
English footballers
English Football League players
Brentford F.C. players
Living people
Sportspeople from Reading, Berkshire
Association football forwards
Rothwell Town F.C. players
Portsmouth F.C. players
Arsenal F.C. players
Footballers from Berkshire

British estate agents (people)